Brežice railway station is the principal railway station serving Brežice, Slovenia.

History 

On the night of 8/9 June 1944, the station was attacked by a lone Bristol Beaufighter Mk.VI of No.255 Squadron RAF, flying an Intruder Patrol from its base at Foggia, Italy. The crew claimed "Two ammunition trains destroyed, one locomotive damaged and a tented camp at least frightened."

References

External links 
Official site of the Slovenian railways 

Railway stations in Slovenia